Aiaki is a village on Onotoa, atoll in Kiribati. There are 202 residents of the village as of the 2010 census. The nearest villages are Ewena and Otowae to the north; and Tabuarorae to the south. Apart from small breaks, the whole coastline from on the lagoon side is eroding as the result of wave action.

References

Populated places in Kiribati